Yukiyasu Ishikawa (born 9 May 1965) is a Japanese rowing coxswain. He competed in the men's eight event at the 1988 Summer Olympics.

References

1965 births
Living people
Japanese male rowers
Olympic rowers of Japan
Rowers at the 1988 Summer Olympics
Place of birth missing (living people)
Coxswains (rowing)